Ernest Samuel Marks CBE (7 July 1872 – 2 December 1947) was an Australian sporting administrator and politician.

He was born at West Maitland to Wool broker Joseph Marks and Elizabeth, née Benjamin and attended Royston College in Sydney before becoming a wool trader and becoming involved in the running of the family business, Joseph Marks & Co.

Politics 

Marks served as the Nationalist member for North Sydney in the New South Wales Legislative Assembly from 1927 to 1930.

He had also been active in local government through the Civic Reform Association, serving on Sydney City Council from 1920 to 1927 and from 1930 to 1947, with a period as Lord Mayor in 1930.

Sport 

In 1888–90 Marks won more than forty trophies as an athlete.

He became involved in athletics, serving as secretary of The Amateur Athletic Union of Australia from 1896 to 1934 and as a foundation member of the New South Wales Sports Club. He accompanied the Australian Olympic teams for the 1908 London Games, the 1912 Stockholm Games, and the 1932 Los Angeles Games.

In October 1929, he was the inaugural Chairman of the Australian British Empire Games Committee. He was Chair of the Organising Committee of 1938 British Empire Games held in Sydney.

ES Marks Athletics Field was named in his honour. He donated his large sporting collection to the State Library of New South Wales.

Personal life 

During his life, Marks worshipped at the Great Synagogue (Sydney) and was part of the Jewish community.

With his brother, Percy J. Marks, Ernest took part in the Jewish Literary and Debating Society, and they were founders and office-bearers of the Shakespeare Society. Percy, with Ernest's backing, was instrumental in forming the Australian Jewish Historical Society. Percy was first president in 1939–41, followed by Ernest in 1944–47.

In 1930 he was appointed Commander of the Order of the British Empire (CBE).

Ernest Samuel Marks died in Sydney in 1947.

References

External links
Susan Rutland. Marks, Ernest Samuel (1871–1947), Australian Dictionary of Biography, 1986.
Bruce Coe. E.S. Marks and his Contribution to Australian Sport, PhD Thesis, University of Canberra, 2011.
 
 

1872 births
1947 deaths
Nationalist Party of Australia members of the Parliament of New South Wales
Civic Reform Association politicians
Members of the New South Wales Legislative Assembly
Mayors and Lord Mayors of Sydney
Commanders of the Order of the British Empire
Sydney City Councillors
Australian businesspeople
Australian sports executives and administrators
Commonwealth Games Australia officials
Jewish Australian politicians